Klještani is a village in the municipalities of Vlasenica (Republika Srpska) and Kladanj, Bosnia and Herzegovina.

Demographics 
According to the 2013 census, its population was 25, all Serbs living in the Vlasenica part.

References

Populated places in Kladanj
Populated places in Vlasenica